Thundra is a fictional character appearing in American comic books published by Marvel Comics. She is often aligned with the Fantastic Four. She is a powerful, red haired, amazon-like warrior, or Femizon, from a matriarchal, technologically advanced future timeline where men have been subjugated by women.

Publication history

Thundra was created by Roy Thomas and John Buscema, and first appeared in Fantastic Four #129.

Roy Thomas recalled the character's creation, "A 7-foot Amazon type that I conceived as an homage of sorts to characters like Kirby's Big Barda in his Fourth World by DC Comics.  I asked John Buscema to give her a bandolier around her torso because a number of women's-lib types were wearing them (sometimes with real bullets) in photos in newspapers and magazines."

Fictional character biography

Thundra is a warrior woman and time traveler from an alternate future 23rd century. In the future society she hails from, planet Earth is now known as Femizonia and is ruled by amazon-like female overlords (Femizons) who have conquered and enslaved the diminished male population. The former United States is now the 'United Sisterhood Republic', and Thundra hails from the megalopolis of Greater Milago (a merged sprawl of Milwaukee and Chicago), located in the United Sisterhood's Midwestern Republic. Thundra is renowned as the United Sisterhood's most formidable warrior, having been physically enhanced by genetic engineering and trained from childhood in combat, the martial arts, and military strategy.

She is sent to the 20th century to challenge Fantastic Four member the Thing to a bout of one-on-one combat, believing him to be the strongest male of all time. By beating the Thing in combat, she feels she can prove once and for all that women were superior to the male gender, and finally end a stagnant war between Femizonia and the warlike, male dominated planet of Machus, where the female population had been subjugated by its ruler Mahkizmo.

Thundra is also recruited into the evil group of supervillains known as the Frightful Four by the Wizard, and they battled the Fantastic Four. She secretly has her own agenda and has no real interest in the group. She battled the Thing in personal combat, and then wound up ultimately switching sides and helping the Fantastic Four defeat the Frightful Four after she quits that group.

She later battled the Hulk, who was possessing the Thing's body at the time. Thundra later assisted the Fantastic Four against the Frightful Four again, and then assisted the Fantastic Four against Namor the Sub-Mariner. Her time travel from 23rd Century Femizonia, an alternate future Earth ruled by women, to prevent the formation of Machus, a planet in her alternate future dimension ruled by men, was finally revealed. Alongside the Fantastic Four, she battled Mahkizmo. She ultimately remained in the 20th Century after a dimensional interface of Femizonia and Machus occurred.  She later assisted the Fantastic Four and Tigra against the Frightful Four, and then assisted the Fantastic Four, Tigra, and the Impossible Man against the Brute, Mad Thinker, and Annihilus.

Thundra later met wrestling promoter Herkimer Oglethorpe, and on his advice she became a professional wrestler training with the Grapplers, a group of female wrestlers who possess cybernetic-endowed superpowers. In a fixed wrestling match with one Grappler member, Thundra (who has superior strength and fighting skills) is secretly drugged by her opponent, causing her to black out and lose the match.

When she awakens, it was revealed that the Grapplers were actually agents working for the Roxxon Oil Company, a multinational petroleum company which was covertly involved in developing advanced technology and weaponry for sinister motives. The Grapplers were assigned to trick Thundra into helping them sabotage Project Pegasus, a prison/research facility built for housing supervillains. They were employed to smuggle the Nth Projector out of Project Pegasus.

As a result of the deception by Roxxon and the Grapplers, Thundra came to blows (yet again) with the Thing (in whom she has expressed a romantic interest, on more than one occasion). Alongside the Thing, Quasar, Giant-Man, and the Aquarian, she fought the Nth Man. She encountered the duplicate Hyperion and the Avengers, and battled Ms. Marvel. She is briefly allied with the duplicate Hyperion while still in service to Roxxon, and with him stole the Nth Projector from the Nth Command, before she returned to an alternate Femizonia which did not interface with Machus.

Sometime later, Thundra was revealed as the Empress of Femizonia. She teamed with the Thing to battle Machan rebels. She later abducted the Avengers and Fantastic Four to the future to enlist their aid in defending Femizonia from the extra-dimensional warlord Arkon and his warriors from Polemachus. She fought Arkon in personal combat, and became romantically inclined toward him.

However, Thundra has a special place in her heart for Ben Grimm. In addition to her amorous advances, the two have been involved in numerous superheroic adventures; one significant pairing of the two involved enlisting Grimm to help liberate Femizonia from a powerful, six-armed android sent from Machus to conquer the Femizons. After defeating the android, Grimm informed Thundra that they could never be together, expressing his love for Alicia Masters. Thundra then allowed him to return to the 20th century.

Secret Invasion: Inhumans
Medusa and Crystal infiltrate Thundra's present-day homeland in order to retrieve part of a device required to rescue Black Bolt from the Skrulls intent on weaponizing him. As tensions between the two disguised women boil over, Thundra appears and compels them to undertake the ritual combat required of the society to resolve the disagreement. Thundra is convinced to hand over the Skrull intelligence agent after Crystal makes an impassioned speech.

Lady Liberators
Thundra, Sue Storm and Valkyrie team up with She-Hulk and her Skrull partner Jazinda (masquerading as a Shi'ar) in order to forcibly distribute stagnating aid in the corrupt country of Marinmer.

Alliance with the Red Hulk
The Red Hulk battles the Lady Liberators and tricks them into believing they caused him to pass out. Red Hulk then kidnaps Thundra, and offers her an alliance after deducing she was the only one of the group that was willing to kill him. After agreeing to the alliance, Thundra becomes a subordinate of the Intelligencia, a group of genius villains founded by Leader. After Red Hulk is betrayed by the Intelligencia in the "Fall of the Hulks" storyline, Thundra aids him in his escape and leaves the group. Since her departure from the group, her daughter Lyra has joined their ranks.

Powers and abilities
As a result of genetic engineering, Thundra has vast superhuman strength and resistance to physical injury sufficient to allow her to stand toe to toe with the likes of the Thing.  Her speed, stamina, agility, and reflexes are heightened to the peak of natural human capability. She has undergone intensive pain-management training.

Trained as a warrior, with extensive training in the hand-to-hand and military combat techniques of the 23rd Century, she is a seasoned combat veteran who possesses superior fighting skills and is considered to be the greatest warrior among her people. Thundra is also a skilled combatant with a sword or her three-foot linked chain, the latter of which is her weapon of choice, often attached to a bracelet on her left forearm.

Other versions

Avengers Forever

Thundra also appears in the Marvel Comics Maxi-Series Avengers Forever. In the storyline, she is a member of a rag-tag remnant of Avengers in an alternate future where Earth has been devastated by evil robotic alien invaders from Mars. She still wields a chain as her personal weapon. Unlike the other remaining Avengers (most notably the Black Panther), it appears that Thundra has not aged. Perhaps this is due to the Femizonian genetic engineering that she was subjected to, the source of her superhuman abilities.

Hulk: Raging Thunder
A future version of Thundra took cell scrapings from the Hulk which were used by scientists in the future to impregnate her. This Thundra later gives birth to a green skinned daughter who is the child of herself and the Hulk. This girl, Lyra, is later nicknamed "She-Hulk". She later returns to the future to insert Lyra's birth.

JLA/Avengers
Thundra appeared in JLA/Avengers in the prologue where she is seen on Polemachus in bed with Arkon. He offers to take her hunting, but Krona appears and destroys Polemachus, Thundra and her entire universe. At the end of the series everything is restored to normal.

Marvel Zombies: Return
In Marvel Zombies: Return: Avengers, Thundra is shown to be a member of the Sentry's undead group along with Super-Skrull, Quasar, Moon Knight, Namor the Sub-Mariner and Quicksilver. She argues with Quicksilver that she will not eat the meat of men because she will not let her perfect warrior's body be "tainted by flesh with the Y-chromosome". After being lured to the Savage Land by The New Avengers she is ripped in half by a zombified Hulk.

Reception
Thundra was ranked 62nd in Comics Buyer's Guide's "100 Sexiest Women in Comics" list.

In other media

Television
Thundra appears in Ultimate Spider-Man animated series episodes "Great Power", "Great Responsibility", "Reveal", and "Second Chance Hero", voiced by Tara Strong. This version is a member of the Frightful Four.

Video games
 Thundra appears as a playable character in the Facebook game Marvel: Avengers Alliance.
 Thundra appears in several cards in the mobile card game Marvel: War of Heroes.

Toys
Thundra has been made an action figure in the Marvel Legends line by Hasbro.

See also
 List of women warriors in literature and popular culture

References

External links
 Thundra at Marvel.com
 

Characters created by John Buscema
Characters created by Roy Thomas
Comics characters introduced in 1972
Fictional genetically engineered characters
Fictional people from the 23rd-century
Fictional swordfighters in comics
Fictional women soldiers and warriors
Marvel Comics characters with superhuman strength
Marvel Comics female superheroes
Marvel Comics female supervillains
Time travelers